Bailando por un Sueño is a franchised TV series in various Latin American countries. Meaning "Dancing for a dream", it is a reality series that commenced on the Mexican television network Canal de las Estrellas, in which celebrities are partnered with common, everyday people with dreams they want to fulfil, who each week compete against each other in a competition to impress a panel of judges. In each show, the two couples who receive the lowest score go head to head against each other to survive potential elimination. Through a telephone poll, viewers vote who should stay and who should go, the results of the poll being combined with the ranking of the panel of judges. The process continues until there are only two couples standing. Rather than the promise of a large cash prize, the winner gets a previously stated wish granted. The show is also broadcast in the United States on Univision. This Includes a lot of famous actors and actresses from Latin America.

Many Latin American countries developed their own versions on a similar format after success of the launch. Countries broadcasting similar format shows include Mexico, Argentina, Bolivia, Chile, Colombia, Brazil, Costa Rica, Ecuador, El Salvador, Honduras, Panama, Paraguay, Peru (as El Gran Show), and on the European continent, Bulgaria, Czech Republic, Slovakia (as Tanečný pre Dream) and Romania (as Dansez pentru tine).

Legal controversy 

In September 2011, Italy's Canale 5 owned by Mediaset launched a series, hosted by Barbara d'Urso, called Baila, based on Bailando por un Sueño.  The owners of Dancing With The Stars, BBC Worldwide, and local RAI presenter Milly Carlucci took Mediaset to court, arguing that Baila infringed on the rights of Dancing With The Stars.  The court agreed, finding that the addition of 'dreamers' was not a sufficient difference in the format, and a later court upheld that judgement in November 2011.  Baila was quickly taken off air.

Bailando por un Sueño worldwide

International events

Bailando por un Sueño: Campeonato Internacional de Baile (Meaning Dancing for a Dream: International Dance Championship) was a pan-national competition between winners from various countries.

There were two such contests one in 2007 and another on 2010.

References

Las Estrellas original programming
Dance competition television shows